Francesco Sartori (born 1957) is an Italian composer and piano and trumpet player.

Works 
Sartori composed "Con te partirò" ("With you, I will leave") with Lucio Quarantotto for Andrea Bocelli. Con te partirò was also recorded by Jonas Kaufmann with Orchestra Sinfonica Del Teatro Massimo Di Palermo directed by Asher Fisch (Sony Classical 018363288875) and as a duet entitled "Time to Say Goodbye" with Andrea Bocelli and Sarah Brightman.
 
Sartori and Quarantotto also composed "Canto della Terra" and "Immenso", both recorded by Bocelli for his 1999, Sogno album and "Mille Lune Mille Onde", for his 2001 album Cieli di Toscana. "Canto della Terra" was also later recorded as a duet between Bocelli and Brightman in 2007.

Sartori and Quarantotto, working for Sugar Music, have composed much of Bocelli's pop repertoire.

References

External links
 Francesco Sartori at Sugar Music
 

Italian male composers
Italian trumpeters
Male trumpeters
1957 births
Living people
21st-century trumpeters
Italian male pianists
21st-century pianists
21st-century Italian male musicians